The 1990 Chicago Bears season was their 71st regular season and 20th postseason completed in the National Football League (NFL). The Bears were looking to return to the playoffs after missing them in 1989 and did so, winning their sixth NFC Central Division championship in seven seasons. With the change in playoff structuring that began in 1990, the Bears were not guaranteed a bye week for winning the division and had to play on Wild Card weekend. They defeated the New Orleans Saints in the Wild Card round but were defeated by the eventual Super Bowl champion New York Giants at Giants Stadium in the Divisional Playoffs. This was also the last division title the Bears would win until 2001.

For the only time in Mike Ditka's tenure as the Bears' head coach, the team played a regular season game in the state of Arizona when they visited the Phoenix Cardinals on October 28.  Chicago left Tempe victorious; it was the Bears' first matchup against the Cardinals since Chicago visited the Cardinals in St. Louis six years earlier.

Late in the season, tragedy struck when defensive tackle Fred Washington, the Bears' second-round pick in the 1990 NFL Draft, was killed in a car accident on December 21, 1990.

Offseason

NFL draft

Staff

Roster

Regular season

Schedule

Game summaries

Week 1

Week 2

Standings

Post Season 
In the Wild Card, the Bears defeated the New Orleans Saints to advance to a Divisional Round matchup against the New York Giants. The Giants ended the Bears playoff run on their way to winning the Super Bowl.

Wild Card 
The Bears defense held the Saints to 193 total yards, 65 rushing yards, 6 first downs, and two field goals. Chicago also recorded 365 yards of total offense. Bears running back Neal Anderson compiled 102 rushing yards, 42 receiving yards, and threw a 22-yard Halfback option pass.

The score was 10–3 at the end of the first half, due to a Kevin Butler field goal and Mike Tomczak's 18-yard touchdown pass to tight end James Thornton. The Saints' only score of the half was a 47-yard field goal by Morten Andersen, who would later miss from 41 yards and have another attempt blocked. Also, with 3 minutes left before halftime, New Orleans starting quarterback Steve Walsh, who had completed just 6 of 16 passes, was knocked out of the game and replaced by John Fourcade. Fourcade fared no better, finishing the game with just 5 of 18 for 79 yards, including two interceptions.

Still the Saints were just trailing 10–3 near the end of the third quarter, and had a great chance to tie the game when defensive tackle Renaldo Turnbull blocked Butler's 45-yard field goal attempt. New Orleans defensive end Vince Buck recovered the ball and returned it 62 yards for a potential touchdown, only to see the play wiped out by an offsides penalty on teammate Robert Massey, who had lined up with his hand over the neutral zone. The penalty not only eliminated the score, but it also gave Chicago a first down, and 7 plays later, Butler kicked a 25-yard field goal to put them up 13–3.

With 5:52 left in the fourth quarter, Andersen's 38-yard field goal brought the scoring difference back to just a touchdown at 13–6. However, when faced with 3rd and 11 on the Bears ensuing drive, Tomczak completed a 38-yard pass to Dennis Gentry, enabling Chicago to maintain possession and drive to Butler's game clinching 21-yard field goal with 3:47 remaining on the clock.

You just try to line up as close as you can; I didn't realize I was offside", said Massey about his critical penalty after the game. "But when I saw the flag, I said, 'Oh, God!' I knew it was me."

This was Mike Ditka's last playoff win as Bears head coach.

Divisional 

The Giants defense dominated the game by allowing only 27 rushing yards and 3 points. This was the fewest rushing yards Chicago had gained in a game since 1967. Their previous low for the season was 100. Bears running back Neal Anderson, who had rushed for over 1,000 yards in the season and 102 yards in the previous playoff game, was held to 19 yards on 12 carries. Giants quarterback Jeff Hostetler, playing because starter Phil Simms suffered a season-ending injury, completed 10 out of 17 passes for 122 yards and two touchdowns, while also rushing for 43 yards and another score.

On Chicago's second possession of the game, Giants defensive back Mark Collins intercepted Mike Tomczak's pass after it bounced out of the hands of Dennis Gentry and returned it 11 yards to set up a 46-yard field goal by Matt Bahr. The Bears took the ensuing kickoff and drove to the Giants 27, but on 4th down and 12, coach Mike Ditka decided against attempting a field goal in the 13 mph winds. On Chicago's conversion attempt, Anderson caught a pass from Tomczak, but was stuffed after a short gain. The Giants then drove 75 yards, including a 6-yard fourth-down conversion catch by reserve tight end Bob Mrosko, to go up 10–0 on Hostetler's 21-yard completion to Stephen Baker.

In the second quarter, Hosteler lost a fumble while being sacked by Steve McMichael, and Bears lineman Dan Hampton recovered the ball. Chicago then drove to the Giants 1-yard line. But on a 4th down conversion attempt, Giants defensive end John Washington plowed through Jim Covert's block attempt and tackled fullback Brad Muster for a loss. Still, the Bears managed to force a three-and-out, and convert good starting field position into a 33-yard field goal by Kevin Butler. But before the end of the half, the Giants went up 17–3 with an 80-yard, 11-play scoring drive. On the first play, Hostetler scrambled away from a Bears blitz and rushed for 11 yards. Later on, he converted a 4th and 1 at the Bears 32 with a 10-yard burst, and eventually he finished the drive with a 5-yard touchdown pass to tight end Howard Cross.

In the third quarter, Hostelter converted his third 4th down of the day with 9-yard scramble on 4th and 6, and finished the drive with a 3-yard touchdown run, putting his team up 24–3. Chicago responded with a drive to the Giants 5-yard line. On 4th and goal, Muster caught a pass at the 1, but was dropped by linebackers Pepper Johnson and Gary Reasons before he could get across the goal line. In the fourth quarter, Giants defensive back Everson Walls returned an interception 37 yards to the Giants 49. The Giants then went on a 51-yard drive consisting of 16 running plays, the last a 1-yard touchdown plunge by fullback Maurice Carthon, that ate up 10:30 of play time.

This game offered a preview of what lay in store for Super Bowl XXV, as the Giants scored on drives of 75, 80, 49 and 51 yards, which lasted nine, 11, 11 and 16 plays. Overall, the Giants held the ball for 38:22, compared to Chicago's 21:38. The only negative thing for New York was the loss of running back Rodney Hampton, who suffered a broken leg in the first half.

References

External links

 1990 Chicago Bears at Pro-Football-Reference.com

Chicago Bears
Chicago Bears seasons
NFC Central championship seasons
Bear
1990 in Illinois
1990s in Chicago